Events in the year 2022 in Namibia.

Incumbents 

 President: Hage Geingob
 Vice President: Nangolo Mbumba
 Prime Minister: Saara Kuugongelwa
 Deputy Prime Minister: Netumbo Nandi-Ndaitwah
 Chief Justice: Peter Shivute

Events 
Ongoing – COVID-19 pandemic in Namibia

 15 March – Namibia drops its requirement of face mask and mandatory PCR COVID-19 test for vaccinated visitors as the number of cases falls.
 June – The Omburu Solar Power Station becomes operational.
 July – Bethanie Desalination Plant becomes operational.
 The Ministry of Public Enterprises is disbanded

Sports 

 September 2021 – June 2022: 2021–22 Namibia Football Premier League
 28 July – 8 August: Namibia at the 2022 Commonwealth Games

Deaths 

 22 January – Katuutire Kaura, 80, politician, MP (1990–2015)
 16 February – Alpheus Muheua, 65, politician
 5 March – Immanuel Ngatjizeko, 69, politician, MP (since 2000)
 4 May – Gerhard Mans, 60, rugby union player (Free State Cheetahs, South West Africa, national team)

References 

 
2020s in Namibia
Years of the 21st century in Namibia
Namibia
Namibia